LaGrange, also known as La Grange Plantation or Meredith House, is a historic home located at Cambridge, Dorchester County, Maryland, United States. It was built about 1760.  The house is a -story Flemish bond brick house and is one of the few remaining Georgian houses in the town. Sun porches and a frame wing were added to the main house in the late 19th and early 20th centuries. Three outbuildings remain, including a late 19th-century dairy, an 18th-century smokehouse, and a 20th-century garage.

LaGrange was listed on the National Register of Historic Places in 1980.

La Grange Plantation
The Dorchester County Historical Society owns the La Grange Plantation and operates it as an open museum of local history. The different buildings include the 1760 period furnished Meredith House, exhibits on local history, agriculture, domestic life, antique transportation vehicles, and tools used by a woodworker, wheelwright and blacksmith.

References

External links
Dorchester County Historical Society
, including photo from 1999, at Maryland Historical Trust

Houses on the National Register of Historic Places in Maryland
Houses in Dorchester County, Maryland
Houses completed in 1760
Georgian architecture in Maryland
Museums in Dorchester County, Maryland
Historic house museums in Maryland
Open-air museums in Maryland
Cambridge, Maryland
National Register of Historic Places in Dorchester County, Maryland